The relatively small Rotomā Caldera (also known as Rotomā Embayment, Rotomā volcanic complex, and spelled Rotoma) is in the Taupō Volcanic Zone in the North Island of New Zealand.

Geography
The Rotomā Embayment is located halfway between the city of Rotorua and town of Whakatāne, with its in filling Lake Rotomā being the easternmost in the chain of three volcanic lakes to the northeast of Lake Rotorua. The other two are Lake Rotoiti and Lake Rotoehu.

Geology
It is immediately to the northeast of the area previously called the Haroharo volcanic complex, and now known as the Haroharo vent alignment which is now regarded as part of the much larger Ōkataina Caldera ( Ōkataina Volcanic Centre). It has been usually classified as part of this volcanic structure,  but given the evidence that it is a region of structural collapse beyond the Ōkataina Caldera rim is perhaps best called an embayment. It is associated with the northern fault boundary zone (Rotoehu Fault, Manawahe Fault, North Rotomā Fault, Braemar Fault, Mangaone Fault) of current rift activity in the Taupō Volcanic Zone. The caldera is likely overlying the former drainage valley that historically Lake Rotorua used before the Rotoiti eruption of the Ōkataina Caldera 47,400 ± 1500 years ago. The Rotomā volcano's most prominent feature Lake Rotomā was formed within the Rotomā caldera when lava flows following a large crater explosion blocked its outlet. It is known that the changes in vegetation following the eruption, while significant were short-lived, with pre-eruption forest and mire vegetation recovering to former levels within about 106 years.

References

Calderas of New Zealand
 
Taupō Volcanic Zone
VEI-7 volcanoes
Volcanoes of the Bay of Plenty Region